The 1989 Benson & Hedges Championships was a men's tennis tournament played on indoor carpet courts at the Wembley Arena in London, England that was part of the 1989 Nabisco Grand Prix. It was the 14th edition of the tournament and was held from 7 November until 12 November 1989. Second-seeded Michael Chang won the singles title.

Finals

Singles

 Michael Chang defeated  Guy Forget 6–2, 6–1, 6–1
 It was Chang's 2nd title of the year and the 3rd of his career.

Doubles

 Jakob Hlasek /  John McEnroe defeated  Jeremy Bates /  Kevin Curren 6–1, 7–6
 It was Hlasek's 5th title of the year and the 11th of his career. It was McEnroe's 6th title of the year and the 142nd of his career.

References

External links
 ITF tournament edition details

Benson and Hedges Championships
Benson and Hedges Championships
Benson and Hedges Championships
Benson and Hedges Championships
Benson and Hedges Championships
Tennis in London